Texas Leadership Charter Academy (TLCA) has Charter school locations in San Angelo, Midland, Arlington, and Abilene. TLCA was approved to become a charter school in November 2008, and was established in August 2009. The TLCA mascot is the Eagle. The school colors are Carolina blue, black, and white.

Grades 
TLCA San Angelo has grades K–12. 
TLCA San Angelo has three campuses, Elementary Campus (K-6th Grades) the Jr High Campus (7th–8th Grades) and the High School Campus (9th-12th Grades)
TLCA Midland has grades K–11, and grades will be added on per year to reach the 12th grade.
TLCA Arlington has grades K-11, and grades will added on per year to reach the 12th grade.
TLCA Abilene has grades K-9, and grades will be added on per year to reach the 12th grade.

TLCA-San Angelo

Campuses
 Elementary campus
 Jr. High campus
 High School Campus
Starting the Fall 2014 school year, the high school (9-12) is located at the original Melrose campus; Melrose is also home to a high school practice gymnasium, and the practice football field.
The Secondary campus is home to the Jr. High (7-8th); also includes a gymnasium.
The complex is home to the TLCA elementary, a high school level gymnasium, and offices.

TLCA Midland
TLCA was granted an additional charter to begin in Midland in May 2013. They acquired offices, began enrolling, and started classes for the 2013–14 school year; which began with grades K–3, every year TLCA Midland will add one grade level until it reaches 12th grade.

TLCA Arlington
TLCA announced in 2013 that another campus, in Arlington, Texas would be opening up for the 2014-2015 school year. The school is K-8, adding a grade per year.

TLCA Abilene

TLCA announced the opening of the Abilene campus in Abilene, Texas would be opening for the 2015-2016 school year. The school is K-9, adding a grade per year.

Athletics 
The TLCA athletics debuted in the 2009-10 school year in the private school T-CAL league. Beginning in the 2010-11 school year, the athletics struggled through the first two years of UIL athletics. In 2012, the programs started to perform better, winning three district championships in two sports, in two years. The current TLCA-San Angelo sports are:
Football, Volleyball, Basketball, Track, Baseball, Softball, and Cheerleading.

Football
The 2009 Eagle football team  played a half season as an 11-man team, then changed to six-man football, so that the team could participate in the T-CAL football district. The 2009 Eagles football team had a regular season record of 5–4 and in district went 1–2.

The 2010 Eagles football team struggled in the first years of UIL district 6A district football.
The TLCA Eagles fought for their historical first victory against the Cross Plains Buffaloes August 31, 2012 by a score of 34–17.

The 2012 Eagles football team finished the season with a 6–4 record. This was the first winning record in the school history.

In 2013, the TLCA Eagles achieved their first shut-out, winning 21–0 against Cross Plains. The following game they earned the most points in program history with a 75-14 win over the Ranger Bulldogs. After a 55–7 victory over Irion County High School the team clinched the District 6A title, the first outright win for the school, the Eagles also clinched their first ever football playoff spot. The TLCA Eagles finished with a 9-0 record in the 2013 regular season. On November 23, 2013, the Eagles won their first ever playoff game, and the area championship, against the Hamlin Pied Pipers; TLCA won the game by a score of 49-18. The historic season for the Eagles was ended with a loss to the Muenster Hornets in Stephenville; the Eagles lost by a score of 41–18, with a season record of 10–1.
In UIL play, the Eagles have a winning percentage of .383, and a record of 31-50 all time.

Basketball
The boys basketball team competes in district 8A and is led by Coach Tim Howard. The 2012-13 boys basketball team was the District 8A Co-Champions, they shared the championship with the Christoval Cougars after a 41–36 win in the Angelo State University Junell Center. The historic season sent the Eagles to the first playoff game in school history. The Eagles went on to lose the game 51–44 in Big Spring, Texas to the Wink Wildcats. The Eagles finished the season 20-8 overall and 10-2 in district. Four of the five Eagles starters will return for the 2013–14 season as seniors.
The 2013-14 TLCA Eagles basketball team finished the season Friday, February 21, 2014 with an area finals loss to the Tahoka Bulldogs by a score of 81-78. The team finished 20-5, 12-0 in District 8A play, winning the district consecutively (co-champions 2012-2013). In the 2014-2015 season the team was realigned into district 6AAA.
The 2015-16 boys basketball team, once again made school history. The Eagles won the first basketball playoff game in school history, going on to win two more games before losing in the first round of the regional tournament, to the eventual state champion Brownfield Cubs. The 2015-16 Eagles earned bi-district, area, and regional quarterfinal champions, as well as regional qualifiers.

Baseball
The TLCA baseball team plays in district 2-1A.
On April 23, 2012 the varsity baseball team had their historical first varsity game win, as they had only beaten junior varsity teams. The Eagles won the double header 21–2, and 19–8 against the Westbrook Wildcats.

Softball
In 2011, the Lady Eagles softball team nearly made it to a District 2-1A  playoff spot after going 7–7 in district play, and losing to Winters in the final inning.

Track
The Eagle track team has been successful in a number of areas, in 2011 two athletes, Rebekah Johnson and Shannon Fay, advanced to the regional track meet in Abilene, Texas. Johnson competed in shot-put and Fay in high jump. The two did not qualify for the state meet, but in 2013 GinnieMarie Lee advanced to the state meet in the 100 meter dash and the triple-jump; she placed third in triple jump.

Fine Arts
Fine arts at TLCA include band and choir.
The Flying Eagle band in San Angelo is currently directed by Bryan Patterson, succeeding Homer Stewart. The band received the Sweepstakes award at their very first competition, the Sound Waves Music Festival near New Braunfels. 
The Flying Eagle Marching Band performed its first marching show for the 2013 season, which included an area-wide competition, the band received a Second division Excellent performance. The Flying Eagle band traveled to the 2013 Texas Charter Schools Conference in Ft. Worth on December 11, 2013. The performance included a brief welcoming parade, and playing a casual concert during the conference.
The Flying Eagle Concert Band participated in the programs first UIL concert and sight-reading competition in Midland, TX. The band received sweepstakes, earning only "1's" from the judges in both concert and sight-reading.

External links 
 / TLCA Corporate
 [www.tlca-sanangelo.com / TLCA San Angelo]
 / TLCA Midland 
 / TLCA Arlington 
 / TLCA Abilene
 / UIL

Buildings and structures in San Angelo, Texas
Charter schools in Texas
Schools in Tom Green County, Texas
Public high schools in Texas
Public middle schools in Texas
Public elementary schools in Texas